Abraham Vanderveer (February 1781July 21, 1839) was a U.S. Representative from New York.

Born in Kings County, New York, Vanderveer attended the common schools.  He served as county clerk of Kings County in 1816–1821 and 1822–1837.  Upon its organization, he was elected treasurer of the Brooklyn Savings Bank.

Vanderveer was elected as a Democrat to the Twenty-fifth Congress (March 4, 1837 – March 3, 1839).  He was not a candidate for renomination in 1838.  He died in Brooklyn, New York, on July 21, 1839.  He was interred in Reformed Dutch Cemetery.

References

1781 births
1839 deaths
American people of Dutch descent
Politicians from Brooklyn
Democratic Party members of the United States House of Representatives from New York (state)
19th-century American politicians